Van der Ryn is a surname. Notable people with the surname include:

Ethan Van der Ryn (born 1962), American sound editor
Sim Van der Ryn, American architect, researcher, and educator

See also
Van Rijn, Dutch surname with the same origin

Surnames of Dutch origin